Apatophysis barbara is a species of African longhorn beetle in the tribe Apatophyseini with records from Algeria and Tunisia.  It is the type species in the subgenus Apatophysis.

References

External links

Dorcasominae